Annonacin is a chemical compound with toxic effects, especially in the nervous system, found in some fruits such as the paw paw, custard apples, soursop, and others from the family Annonaceae. It is a member of the class of compounds known as acetogenins. Annonacin-containing fruit products are regularly consumed throughout the West Indies for their traditional medicine uses.

Traditional medicine

Historically, plants and fruits of Annonaceae (particularly Annona muricata and Annona squamosa) have been consumed in various forms throughout the West Indies, usually as hot water extracts of leaves. These annonacin-containing herbal teas are thought to be useful in folk medicine. On the Caribbean island of Guadeloupe, such teas are consumed mainly for their sedative qualities. Use of annonacin products in Guadeloupe often lasts from early childhood through old age, and daily consumption is not uncommon.

It was discovered in Guadeloupe that atypical Parkinsonism was predominant in elderly males, who regularly consume annonacin-containing herbal teas. Of 87 people with Parkinsonism transferred to one clinic between 1996 and 1998, 25% had Parkinson's, while 36% had progressive supranuclear palsy and 39% had atypical Parkinsonism.

Neurotoxicity

Annonacin is a disabling and potentially lethal neurotoxin. Like other acetogenins, it is a mitochondrial complex I (NADH-dehydrogenase) inhibitor. As NADH-dehydrogenase is responsible for the conversion of NADH to NAD+ as well as the establishment of a proton gradient in the mitochondria, annonacin disables the ability of a cell to generate ATP through oxidative phosphorylation, leading to cell apoptosis or necrosis.

The LC50 of annonacin is 0.018 μM to dopaminergic neurons, and it is the damage done to these neurons that results in the neurodegenerative effects of the toxin. Annonacin is 100 times more toxic than 1-methyl-4-phenylpyridinium (MPP+), another potent mitochondrial complex I inhibitor. Compared to MPP+, annonacin produces a wider and more dramatic loss of neurons, not only in the nigro-striatal system, but in the basal ganglia and brainstem nuclei as well.

Annonacin has been linked to the abnormally high incidence of progressive supranuclear palsy as well as atypical Parkinsonism in the Caribbean island of Guadeloupe where consumption of fruits such as the soursop (Annona muricata) is common. An average-sized soursop fruit contains 15 mg of annonacin, while a can of commercial nectar contains 36 mg and a cup of infusion, 140 μg. Studies in rodents indicate that consumption of annonacin (3.8 and 7.6 mg per kg per day for 28 days) caused brain lesions consistent with Parkinson's disease. An adult who consumes a fruit or can of nectar daily over the course of a year is estimated to ingest the same amount of annonacin that induced brain lesions in the rodents receiving purified annonacin intravenously.

Biosynthesis 
Based on basic polyketide synthesis, the biosynthesis of annonacin is likely accomplished by a modular polyketide synthase (PKS). The biosynthesis likely involves the use of 17 modules consisting of a number of enzymes commonly found in PKS. These include the acyl carrier protein (ACP), acetyl transferase (AT), ketosynthase (KS), malonyl transferase (MT; which can come carrying a variety of functionalities), ketoreductase (KR), dehydratase (DH), and enoyl reductase (ER). An example of the possible modular biosynthetic pathway detailing the combination of these enzymes and the subsequent modules can be seen in the figure below.

References 

Furanones
Tetrahydrofurans
Polyols
Polyketides
Neurotoxins
NADH dehydrogenase inhibitors
Respiratory toxins
Plant toxins